Mouding County (Chuxiong Yi script: ,) is located in Chuxiong Yi Autonomous Prefecture, Yunnan province, China.

Administrative divisions
Mouding County has 4 towns and 3 townships. 
4 towns

3 townships
 Panmao
 Xujie
 Anle

Climate

References

External links
Mouding County Official Website

 
County-level divisions of Chuxiong Prefecture